Thomas George Bell (2 August 1933 – 4 October 2006) was an English actor on stage, film and television. He often played "menacing or seedy roles, perhaps most memorably playing sexist Detective Sergeant Bill Otley, antagonist to Helen Mirren's DCI Jane Tennison in Prime Suspect".

Early life
Bell was born on 2 August 1933, in Liverpool, Lancashire. His family was large, and he had little contact with his father, a merchant seaman. Evacuated as a child during the Second World War, he lived with three different families in Morecambe, Lancashire. In 1948, at age 15, Bell began to act in school plays. His younger brother Keith also became an actor.

On leaving school he trained under Esme Church at the Bradford Civic Theatre; fellow pupils included Billie Whitelaw and Robert Stephens. He later worked in repertory in Liverpool and Dublin.

Career
Michael Coveney described Bell as a "naturally gifted and unusually reserved leading actor", with a "quiet, mesmeric brand of acting". On television he had the role of Albert Stokes in Harold Pinter's first success in the medium, A Night Out (1960), while in the same year his first film appearance came in Joseph Losey's The Criminal. He continued to appear in the British New Wave films of the early 60s including The Kitchen (1961) and The L-Shaped Room (1962) with Leslie Caron.  At an awards ceremony for the latter, he drunkenly interrupted a speech by Prince Philip, yelling "Tell us a funny story", to the obvious embarrassment of table companions Richard Attenborough and Bryan Forbes. While the Duke of Edinburgh apparently took the heckle in good humour, retorting "If you want a funny story, I suggest you engage a professional comic", the incident added to Bell's reputation as a hellraiser, and "did little to further [his] career". His other notable films of the decade included H.M.S. Defiant  (1962), A Prize of Arms (1962), Ballad in Blue (1965), He Who Rides a Tiger (1965) and The Long Day's Dying (1968). 

In 1978, he came to worldwide attention portraying Adolf Eichmann in the Emmy-winning tv-series Holocaust, and he received a BAFTA nomination for the series Out, in which he played convicted armed robber, Frank Ross.

Declared bankrupt in 1982, Bell bounced back with a later career renaissance, appearing in several British films including Wish You Were Here, Peter Greenaway's Prospero's Books, Swing and the 1990 film The Krays, where he played the part of Jack "The Hat" McVitie, one of the Kray twins' murder victims. In 1991, he played the dour owner of a run-down seaside waxworks museum in the Thames TV sitcom Hope It Rains, written by John Esmonde and Bob Larbey and directed by John Howard Davies. It ran for two series comprising thirteen episodes.

Although he tended to eschew live performance, Bell's few stage appearances included a role in the 1979 UK première of Bent, Martin Sherman's play about homosexuality, staged at the Royal Court Theatre. He played the character Horst, opposite Ian McKellen's Max. The play's examination of homosexual love, set in a Nazi death camp, was shocking for many theatregoers at the time and uncovered a previously little-examined area of Nazi brutality.

In the ITV series Prime Suspect, Bell played Detective Sergeant Bill Otley opposite Helen Mirren in the first (1991), third (1993) and final series (2006), the latter being one of his last on-screen appearances. His gripping portrayal of the toxic character secured Bell's second BAFTA nomination, in 1993.

Personal life
Bell was married to the actress Lois Daine from 1960 to 1976. They had one son, Aran, who is also an actor.

His partner from 1976 until his death was the costume designer Frances Tempest, with whom he had a step-daughter, Nellie, and a daughter, Polly.

Death
Bell had enjoyed working with TV director Danny Hiller, and agreed to appear in his first feature film Love Me Still at the suggestion of their mutual friend, showbiz accountant Jose Goumal. While clearly ill, Bell soldiered on and completed filming only a few days before the end of his life. He died in hospital in Brighton on 4 October 2006, aged 73, following a short illness. A few days later, "the poignantly timed broadcast of Prime Suspect - The Final Act" was broadcast, "in which a visibly frail Otley died on screen".

Filmography

Film

 The Criminal (1960) – Flynn
 Payroll (1961) – Blackie
 The Kitchen (1961) – Paul
 Echo of Barbara (1961) – Ben
 H.M.S. Defiant  (1962) – Evans
 A Prize of Arms (1962) – Fenner
 The L-Shaped Room (1962) – Toby
 Sands of Beersheba (1964) – Dan
 Ballad in Blue (1965) – Steve Collins
 He Who Rides a Tiger (1965) – Peter Rayston
 The Violent Enemy (1968) – Sean Rogan
 The Long Day's Dying (1968) – Tom Cooper
 In Enemy Country (1968) – Ian
 Lock Up Your Daughters! (1969) – Shaftoe
 All the Right Noises (1971) – Len Lewin
 Quest for Love (1971) – Colin Trafford
 The Spy's Wife (1972) – Tom Tyler
 Straight on Till Morning (1972) – Jimmy Lindsay
 Royal Flash (1975) – De Gautet
 The Sailor's Return (1978) – William Targett
 Summer Lightning (1984) – Mr Clark
 The Innocent (1985) – Frank Dobson
 The Magic Toyshop (1987) – Uncle Philip
 Wish You Were Here (1987) – Eric
 Resurrected (1989) – Mr. Deakin
 The Krays (1990) – Jack 'The Hat' McVitie
 Prospero's Books (1991) – Antonio
 Let Him Have It (1991) – Fairfax
 Angels (1992) – Michael
 Sensatsiya (1993) – American Scientist
 Seconds Out (1993) – Jack
 Feast of July (1995) – Ben Wainwright
 Preaching to the Perverted (1997) – Henry Harding MP
 Swept from the Sea (1997) – Isaac Foster
 The Boxer (1997) – Joe MaGuire's father (uncredited)
 Swing (1999) – Sid Luxford
 Tube Tales (1999) – Old Gent (segment "Horny")
 The Last Minute (2001) – Grimshanks
 Lava (2001) – Eric
 My Kingdom (2001) – Quick
 Long Time Dead (2002) – Becker
 Oh Marbella! (2003) – Ronnie, Ackerman
 Devil's Gate (2003) – Jake
 Dead Man's Cards (2005) – Billy The Cowboy
 Friends and Enemies (2006)
 Love Me Still (2008) – Lenny Ronson

Television (selected)

 1958: Armchair Theatre: "No Trams to Lime Street"
 1960: Armchair Theatre: A Night Out
 1967: The Virginian Series 6 Episode 5 – Cpl. Johnny Moon
 1970. Angels Are So Few - Play for Today: Dennis Potter, BBC
 1972. ‘’The Frighteners,(ep.4‘the minder’).
 1972: Hedda Gabler (Play of the Month, BBC) – Eilert Lovborg 
 1974: The Protectors – Shadbolt
 1978
 Holocaust (US mini-series) – Adolf Eichmann
 Out (UK series) – Frank Ross
 1981: Sons and Lovers – Walter Morel
 1983: Reilly: Ace of Spies – Felix Dzerzhinsky
 1988: The Rainbow - Old Tom Brangwen
 1990: Chancer – Mr. Love, Derek's father
 1991: Prime Suspect (series 1) – D.S. Bill Otley
 1991–92: Hope It Rains (UK sitcom series) – Harry Nash
 1993:
 Prime Suspect (series 3) – D.S. Bill Otley
 The Young Indiana Jones Chronicles: "Young Indiana Jones and the Phantom Train of Doom" – Paul Emil von Lettow-Vorbeck
 1999 Dalziel and Pascoe ("Recalled to Life")
 2006
 Ancient Rome: The Rise and Fall of an Empire: "Revolution" – Publius Cornelius Scipio Nasica Serapio
 Blue Murder – Vinny McAteer (broadcast 3 November 2006 on ITV)
 Prime Suspect: The Final Act (series 7) – D.S. Bill Otley

Notes

20th-century English male actors
1933 births
2006 deaths